Ignacio Pérez Meza, better known as Luis Pérez Meza (22 May 1917 – 9 June 1981) was a Mexican singer and songwriter of banda and ranchera music who also appeared in several films of the Golden Age of Mexican cinema.

Pérez Meza's holiday home in Mazatlán, Sinaloa served briefly as museum and cultural center.

Filmography 

 Las cuatro milpas (1960)
 El hombre del alazán (1959)
 Cuando se quiere, se quiere (1959)
 Mi adorado salvaje (1952)
 Mariachis (1950)
 Allá en el Rancho Grande (1949)
 Juan Charrasqueado (1948)
 India Bonita

References

External links

1917 births
1981 deaths
Mexican male film actors
Musicians from Sinaloa
20th-century Mexican male actors
20th-century Mexican male singers